All Will Be Well is a 2007 Polish drama film directed by Tomasz Wiszniewski.

Cast 
 Robert Więckiewicz - Andrzej
 Adam Werstak - Pawel Kwiatkowski
 Beata Kawka - Reporter Anna
 Izabela Dąbrowska - Zofia Kwiatkowska
 Daniel Mąkolski - Piotr Kwiatkowski
  - Postman Henio
  - Doctor
 Janusz Kłosiński - Priest
 Zdzisław Kuźniar - Wladek

References

External links 

2007 drama films
2007 films
Polish drama films